Torhild Bransdal  (10 April 1956 – 28 September 2022) was a Norwegian politician. She served as mayor of Vennesla from 1999 to 2017, and was the female mayor in Norway who had been in office for the longest time. She was elected representative to the Storting for the period 2017–2021 for the Christian Democratic Party.

Political career

Local politics
Bransdal was a member of the municipal council of Vennesla from 1991 to 2019. She was the mayor of Vennesla municipality from 1999 to 2017. She thus became the female mayor in Norway who had been in office for the longest time.

Parliament
Bransdal was elected deputy representative to the Storting for the periods 2009–2013 and 2013–2017 from the constituency of Vest-Agder. She was elected ordinary representative to the Storting for the period 2017–2021, representing the Christian Democratic Party.

In the Storting, she was a member of the Standing Committee on Local Government and Public Administration from 2017 to 2021, and also a delegate to the Nordic Council during the same period.

Death
Torhild Bransdal died at the Hospital of Southern Norway on 28 September 2022, after suffering from cancer for an extended period.

References

1956 births
2022 deaths
Christian Democratic Party (Norway) politicians
Members of the Storting
Deputy members of the Storting
Vest-Agder politicians
21st-century Norwegian politicians
Deaths from cancer in Norway